"Fermi and Frost" is a science fiction short story by Frederik Pohl, first published in the January 1985 issue of Isaac Asimov's Science Fiction Magazine. It won the Hugo Award for Best Short Story in 1986.

Summary
The story opens with an astronomer who is at an airport when a nuclear war begins. Recognized by a fan, he is offered a seat on a plane escaping to Iceland. Though Reykjavík is destroyed by a thermonuclear warhead, the rest of the island is unharmed. The survivors take advantage of Iceland's geology and experience with cold weather to prepare for the nuclear winter that follows. Interwoven into the story is speculation about the Fermi paradox and the perspective on the possibility of alien life given the prospects of nuclear war.

Sources, references, external links, quotations

Short stories by Frederik Pohl
1985 short stories
Hugo Award for Best Short Story winning works
Works originally published in Asimov's Science Fiction
Fermi paradox